Flora (minor planet designation: 8 Flora) is a large, bright main-belt asteroid. It is the innermost large asteroid: no asteroid closer to the Sun has a diameter above 25 kilometres (20% that of Flora), and not until 20-km 149 Medusa was discovered was an asteroid known to orbit at a closer mean distance. It is the seventh-brightest asteroid with a mean opposition magnitude of +8.7.

Discovery and naming
Flora was discovered by J. R. Hind on 18 October 1847. It was his second asteroid discovery after 7 Iris.

The name Flora was proposed by John Herschel, from Flora, the Latin goddess of flowers and gardens, wife of Zephyrus (the personification of the West wind), and mother of Spring. The Greek equivalent is Chloris, who has her own asteroid, 410 Chloris, but in Greek 8 Flora is also called 8 Chloris (8 Χλωρίς).

Characteristics

Lightcurve analysis indicates that Flora's pole points towards ecliptic coordinates (β, λ) = (16°, 160°)  with a 10° uncertainty. This gives an axial tilt of 78°, plus or minus ten degrees.

Flora is the parent body of the Flora family of asteroids, and by far the largest member, comprising about 80% of the total mass of this family. Nevertheless, Flora was almost certainly disrupted by the impact(s) that formed the family, and is probably a gravitational aggregate of most of the pieces.

Flora's spectrum indicates that its surface composition is a mixture of silicate rock (including pyroxene and olivine) and nickel-iron metal. Flora, and the whole Flora family generally, are good candidates for being the parent bodies of the L chondrite meteorites. This meteorite type comprises 35% of meteorites impacting the Earth.

Observational mishap 
During an observation on 25 March 1917, 8 Flora was mistaken for the 15th-magnitude star TU Leonis, which led to that star's classification as a U Geminorum cataclysmic variable star.  Flora had come to opposition on 1917 February 13, 40 days earlier. This mistake was uncovered only in 1995.

Occultation
On 26 July 2013, Flora at magnitude 8.8 occulted the star 2UCAC 22807162 over parts of South America, Africa, and Asia.

Popular culture
In the 1968 science-fiction film The Green Slime, an orbital perturbation propels the asteroid Flora into a collision course with Earth.

Notes

References

External links
shape model deduced from lightcurve
 "Announcement of discovery of Flora", MNRAS 8 (1848) 82
 
 

Flora asteroids
Flora
Flora
S-type asteroids (Tholen)
18471018